Amagertorv 1 is a Neoclassical property situated at the corner of Amagertorv and Højbro Plads, opposite Højbrohus, in the Old Town of Copenhagen, Denmark. Constructed in 1797 as part of the rebuilding of the city following the Copenhagen Fire of 1795, it owes its current appearance to a renovation undertaken by Christian Tybjerg in 1854.  The building was listed in the Danish registry of protected buildings and places in 1989. Café Europa, a café started by fashion designer Jørgen Nørgaard in 1989, is located in the building. Notable former residents include photographer Emil Stæhr, landowner and district governor Nicolai Emanuel de Thygeson and composer and music publisher Andreas Peter Berggreen.

History

18th century

The site was in the late 17th century made up of two separate properties. The eastern of these properties was situated at the corner of the relatively narrow street Højbrostræde. It was listed as No. 62 in Strand Quarter in Copenhagen's first cadastre of 1689 and was at that time owned by one Gert Brask’ widow. The western property was as No. 61 owned by merchant (kræmmer) Jochum Snutom . The two properties were listed as No. 62 (old No. 61) and No. 63 (old No. 62) in the new cadastre of 1756. They were at that time owned by merchant (kræmmer) Johan Mathias Bruuns (No. 62) and merchant (kræmmer) Ludvig Vittrog (No. 63).

No. 62 had by 1787 passed to Bruuns' son Nicolay Ludwig Bruns. He lived in the building was his wife Mette Bruns, their two sons (aged 10 and 12), two employees (one of them an apprentice) and two maids.

Christian Stæhr and the new building
 
No. 63 was some time prior to the 1787 census acquired by merchant (hørkræmmer) Christian Stæhr (1749-1811). He resided in the building with his wife Anna Magretha Stæhr (née Lemming), their three children (aged two to nine), the wife's sister Charlotte Leming, a housekeeper (husjomfru), two employees in Stæhr's business, a maid and a lodger. 

The two properties were destroyed in the Copenhagen Fire of 1795, together with most of the other buildings in the area. After the fire, Stæjr purchased the neighboring fire site at No 62 and merged it with his old property at No. 63, The current building on the site was constructed  for him in 1796-97. The identity of the master builder is not known. After the fire, it was decided to replace the densely built-up block on the other side of Højbrostræde with a new square, Højbro Plads, which would act as a fire belt, a decision that gave his new property a much more visible location.

 
At the time of the 1801 census, Stæhr's building was home to a total of 31 residents in five households. Christian Stæhr resided in one of the apartments with his wife,  three of theirchildren (aged nine to 20), his widow mother, an apprentice and two maids. The eldest daughter Charlotte, now married to August Wilhelm Heylmann, a silk and textile merchant, resided in another apartment with her husband, their two-year-old daughter, two employees in his textile business (one of them an apprentice), the stockings-maker Lauritz Salholt and another apprentice. Poul Marcussen (1763-1835), owner of Ørumgaard and Agersbøl in Jutland, resided in a third apartment with his wife Louise Elisabeth Henriette Marcussen (née Saabue, 1777-1858), the wife's sister Christine Saabye, a male servant, Nicolai Emanuel Thygesen (district judge for Zealand and Møn) and Thygesen's servant. Christian Henne Frantz, a tea merchant, resided in the building with Anna Welde. Sophia Ramløse (née Frantz), a widow, resided in the building with her two children (aged five and seven), a maid and the visitor(lodger Paul Stenstrup.

The property was listed as No. 50 in the new cadastre of 1806. Stæhr's business was after his death in 1811 passed to his son Hans Jørgen Stæhr (1785-1852).  
Hans Jørgen Stæjr was still residing in the building on Amagertorv when his youngest daughter Thora Hansine Stæjr was born in 1828. He and his family had by 1780 moved out of the building on Amagertorv. They were at that time residing in a first floor apartment at No. 85 in St. Ann's West Quarter (now Hindegade 9).  The son Emil Stæhr (1827-1912) would later become a photographer. Thora Hansine Stæhr was the mother of composer Sophus Andersen. Her elder sister Wilhelmine Marie Stæhr was the mother of the author and marine painter Holger Drachmann.

The property was home to just 11 residents at the time of the 1880 census. Albert Wilhelmsen Heydtmann, a businessman, resided in one of the two second floor apartments. Hans Michael Am?? Sperling, another businessman, resided on the third and fourth floor with his wife Emma Josephine Eleonora Sperling, their four children (aged seven to 11) and one maid.

Residents, 18271900
At the time of the 1840 census, No. 50 was home to 22 residents in five households. Jørgen Frederik Bruun (1800-1852), surgeon in the 2nd Life Regiment on Foot, resided on the ground floor with his wife Johanne Bruun (née Møhl), their two daughters (aged five and seven), a housekeeper and a maid. Christine Moltzau Richard (née Jensen), a restaurateur, resided on the first floor with a housekeeper, four maids and one male restaurant assistant. Hans Andreas Lund, a clothing retailer (klædehandler), resided on the second floor with two employees in his business (one of them an apprentice) and one maid. Sophie Frederikke Hansen, an unmarried "institute manager", resided on the third floor with the widow Petrine Jacobsen (née Schonning). Christian Richter, a merchant, resided in the basement with an apprentice and a caretaker.

Ane Bolette Heilmann (née Klidt), widow of a silk and textile merchant, was both at the 1845 and 1850 census residing in the third floor apartment.  She is in the census records from 1850 mentioned as the owner of the building. In 1845 she shared it with the widow Andrea M.H. Schiødt (née Lynge, widow of an army major), a maid and two lodgers. At the time of the 1850 census she was sharing the apartment with the widow Lorenze Thalia Theresia Thygesen (née Selmer, widow of bank manager Aksel Møller Thygesen, 1763-1818), the law student Wilhelm Emil Matthias Peterson	and one maid.

At the time of the 1845 census, No. 50 was home to 27 residents. Jørgen Frederik Bruun was still residing on the ground floor with his wife and three children.	Lauritz Laurberg Kongs?? and Bernhard Christian Flor Arentzen, a floor clerk and an apprentice, were now also residing on the ground floor. Christine Moltzau Richard was still residing in the first floor apartment. She now lived there with her son and daughter-in-law as well as seven employees and servants. Ditlev Balthasar Schiøtt, another military surgeon (regimentskirurg), resided on the second floor with his housekeeper Marie Wolberg and one maid. 

On 5 May 1846, Carl Waldemar Stinck (1817-1879) opened a stationery in the building. On 24 November 1849, he also operated it as a bookshop. The shop relocated to Amagertorv 33 in the 1860s. 

Carl Waldemar Stinck resided on the ground floor with the apprentice Lauritz Petersen in 1845. Stine Maltzau Riekær was still residing with her employees on the first floor. Hermann Raphel, a 44-year-old merchant, resided on the second floor with one maid. Johannes Japhet Kehlet. a merchant (urtekræmmersvend), resided in the basement with the apprentice Frederik Ludvig Popp (1731-1893).

The organist, composer and music publisher Andreas Peter Berggreen was among the  resident of the building in 1852. The building was in 1853 subject to a comprehensive renovation undertaken by the architect Christian Tybjerg. The low thir storey was in this connection heightened. Ehen house numbering by street was introduced in 1859 (as a supplement to the old cadastral numbers by quarter), No. 50 was listed as Amagertorv 1 and Højbro Plads 2b-c.

A retailer named Starup had by 1860 opened a clothing shop on the ground floor of the building. Jens Peter Lindhard, a floor clerk, resided in the associated dwelling. Ole Peter Thorsen (1789-1863), a textile merchant (klædehandler), resided on the first floor with his wife Emilie Anrea (mée Øckenholt) and two maids. Andreas Broberg, a merchant, resided alone on the first floor. Frederik Christian Jørgensen, a clock dealer, resided on the second floor with his six children (aged six to 16), a 21-year-old employee (nephew), a housekeeper, two maids and a male servant Wilhelmine Rasmussen, wife of a Otto Frederik Christian Rasmussen (1814-1888), estate manager of Bregentved, was together with three of her children (aged 1+ to 13) putting the family on an extended visit at the time of the census.

Wilhelm Øckenholt Larsen opened a cigar shop at Amagertorv 1 in 864, In 1904, it moved a little down the street to No. 9. C. W. Larsen would later become a well-known cigar brand.

20th century
At the time of the 1906 census, Amagertorv was only home to one household. Daniel Dalsgaard, a coffee merchant, resided on the third floor with his wife Sigrid Louise Johanne Dalsgaard (née Andersen), their one-year-old daughter Anker Niels Daniel Dalsgaard, a 59-year-old relative, a retail clerk in Dalsgaard's coffee shop and two maids. His company was based in the neighboring building at Højbro Plads 4. Lund & Rgorsens Lager, a textile business, was from before 1903 based on the first and second floor of the building. L. C. Smith & Bros, a manufacturer of typewriters, had by 1915 taken over Dalsgaard's apartment on the third floor. Lund & Thorsens Lager was at that time still based on the first and second floor.

Chr. Knudstrup.a coffee, tea and delicacy retail and wholesale business, was from 1907 based on the ground floor of the building. The firm had been founded by Christian Knudstorp (854-1938) at Frederiksberggade 38 in December 1887. It was from 1 September 1938 continued by Vald.emarPedersen (1890-) as Chr. Knudstrup's Eftf. (Chr. Knudtorp's Successor) until at least the 1950s.

The book publisher V. Thaning & Appel's Forlag was from 20 May 1044 based in the building. The company originated in a bookshop established in Pilestræde on 31 May 1866 by Vilhelm Thaning (1837-1917) and L. C. Appel (1838-1893). It had later moved to new premises on Købmagergade. In 1908, it had incidentally also taken over C. W. Stinck's former bookshop at Amagertorv 33. In 1937, it was taken over by N. Helweg-Larsen (911-). In 1941, he partnered with Godfred Hartmann (913-). The firm's presence in the market for book publishing was at the same time revived. The bookshop was sold to Erik Paludan in 1947. The publishing house moved to new premises at Snaregade 4 in 1965.

Another commercial venture to relocate to the building in the first half of the 20th century was Arnbak's Kunsthandel, an art dealership owned by Martin Arnbak. It had been founded by him on 3 May 1907 in Bredgade but it is not clear exactly when it moved to Amagertorv. It was based at Amagertorv 1 in 1950.

Café Europa was opened by fashion designer Jørgen Nørgaard  in 1989. He had for many years operated a boutique at Amagertorv 13. Ownership of the café was in 1993 passed to his son Jens Nørgaard.

Architecture

The building is constructed with four storeys over a walk-out basement, It is a three-winged building, surrounding a small central light well, with a five-bays-long facade on Amagertorv, a four-bays-long facade on Højbro Plads  and a six-bays-long facade on Læderstræde. The chamfered corner bays were dictated for all corner buildings by Jørgen Henrich Rawert's and Peter Meyn's guidelines for the rebuilding of the city after the fire so that the fire department's long ladder companies could navigate the streets more easily. The rendered peach-coloured facade is finished with shadow joints on the three upper floors. It is divided horizontally by belt courses between the storeys a cornice below the roof. Other decorative elements include rectangular niches with reliefs below the corner windows on the third floor. The main entrance in the central bay towards Amagertorv and the secondary entrance in Læderstræde are both topped by transom windows. The slate-clad roof features six dormer vindows towards the street.

Today
The building is now owned by E/F Amagertorv 1. Café Eiropa is based on the ground floor.

References

External links

 Christian Stæhr
 Stæhr family tree
 Photo of C. W. Larsen's Tobacco Shop, 1903
 Photo of Amagertorv 1, 1915
 Photo of Amagertorv 1, 1915
 Photo of Amagertorv 1, 1927
 Photo of Amagertorv 1, c. 1927

Listed residential buildings in Copenhagen
Neoclassical architecture in Copenhagen
Residential buildings completed in 1797